The 1988 Miller High Life 400 was a NASCAR Winston Cup Series racing event that took place on September 11, 1988, at Richmond Fairgrounds Raceway (now Richmond Raceway) in the American community of Richmond, Virginia. This race spanned  on Richmond Fairgrounds Raceway's new 0.75 mile configuration.

Background
In 1953, Richmond International Raceway began hosting the Grand National Series with Lee Petty winning that first race in Richmond.  The original track was paved in 1968.  In 1988, the track was re-designed into its present D-shaped configuration

The name for the raceway complex was "Strawberry Hill" until the Virginia State Fairgrounds site was bought out in 1999 and renamed the "Richmond International Raceway".

Qualifying
Davey Allison blistered the field in qualifying, lapping the track with an average of 122.850 miles per hour. Davey's lap was overshadowed by another story. That story was tires! The 1988 season had seen a war between the Hoosier Tire Company and Goodyear develop, and with a new track and surface, several teams elected to change tire brands. Due to NASCAR
rules at the time, those drivers that did switch tires were sent to the back and had there qualifying spot adjusted as well.

With the qualifying order reset the top-10 comprised:

There were at least 45 teams that entered the race, meaning that 9 drivers had to go home.

Qualifying information
Butch Miller gave owner Bob Clark his best ever starting position with the fifth place start. Clark was able to get a second car in the field, a year old Oldsmobile, with dirt track ace Lee Faulk at the wheel. Faulk was making his first ever start in the series. Bob Schacht qualified for the race eventually settling into the 18th spot, with a red #66 Buick. This would be the first (and only) start in NASCAR for Schachts owner Tom Reet.

Race
Allison immediately got a jump on the field as the race almost immediately turned chaotic. Coming into turn 2 Lake Speed and Richard Petty collided. The wrecking didn't stop there, as down the front-stretch coming to yellow, Geoff Bodine ran over the back of Rusty Wallace. Wallace, who had been a major points contender at that point could only run 17 additional laps before parking it with damage. Petty then hit the wall a second time bring out to bring out the second caution, this time the damage was terminal. Rick Wilson had a great run come to a screeching halt, as his Kodak Oldsmobile blew the engine less the 10% of the way in. Harry Gant was the next victim of the track when his car caught on fire, after a grinding crash that had also collected Jimmy Means, Ernie Irvan and Eddie Bierschwale. Mike Alexander, Butch Miller, and Dale Earnhardt took the turns with the lead, after a Hoosier shod Allison, switched to Goodyear tires under the first caution. But after caution four came out (due to another Lake Speed accident) Allison was able to catch up and soon over powered Earnhardt. From there on, it was easy sailing for Davey as he took victory

Results (Top 5)

References

Miller High Life 400 (September)
Miller High Life 400 (September)
NASCAR races at Richmond Raceway